Lakeshore Mall is a regional, enclosed shopping mall located in Sebring, Florida, United States. It opened in 1992. Lakeshore Mall comprises  of retail space, including two anchor stores: Bealls and Belk. Kmart, Sears and JCPenney were also anchor stores, until all three were closed 2017, 2019 and 2020 respectively. The mall also features more than sixty-five store locations, as well as a food court and AMC movie theater.

History
In late 2007, the mall took the unusual step of requiring all high-school aged and younger youths to leave the property by 9pm.

The drawing power of the Mall has attracted the attention of other retail builders. Plaza By The Mall has been built on an adjoining property attempting to cash in on some of the recognition.

In May 2013, CBL & Associates Properties sold the mall to BVB Properties.

On November 2, 2017, Sears Holdings announced that Kmart would be closing as part of a plan to close 63 Sears and Kmarts nationwide. Kmart closed on January 28, 2018. 

On August 6, 2019 Sears announced that its store would be closing this location as part of a plan to close 26 stores nationwide. The store closed in October 2019.

On June 4, 2020, JCPenney announced that this location would close as part of a plan to close 154 stores nationwide, leaving Belk and Bealls as the only anchor stores in the mall. There is also a Planet Fitness and a smoothie vendor.

During the COVID-19 pandemic, the former JCPenney location became a site for Coronavirus vaccine distribution. Florida Governor Ron DeSantis visited the site in March 2021 but the site has since closed.

References

Lakeshore Mall Fact Sheet, CBL & Associates

External links
Lakeshore Mall website

Buildings and structures in Sebring, Florida
Shopping malls in Florida
Shopping malls established in 1992
Tourist attractions in Highlands County, Florida